Andrew Withers (born 5 February 1957) is an Australian rower. He competed in the men's eight event at the 1980 Summer Olympics. He also competed in 1979 World Rowing Championships in Bled.

References

External links
 

1957 births
Living people
Australian male rowers
Olympic rowers of Australia
Rowers at the 1980 Summer Olympics
Place of birth missing (living people)
20th-century Australian people